Public Service Hall is an agency of the Georgian government which provides a variety of public services, including the services of the Civil Registry Agency, the National Agency of Public Registry, the National Archives, the National Bureau of Enforcement and the Notary Chamber of Georgia.  Services are made available at public service halls throughout the country. Currently, Public Service Hall endeavors to provide up to 400 services at the main location in Tbilisi.

Structure

Consumers at the entrance of the Public Service Hall building in Tbilisi are greeted by the service consultants, who put them on the right track with regard to their issue and direct them to relevant operators. It is divided into 3 major areas: Self-service space, Quick service space, and Long service space.

Self-service Area

Automated systems are placed in self-service area. Consumers are able to receive diverse services, such as; extract on property or business registration, biometric photo for ID card and passport, cash withdrawal from ATMs, conducting distance payments via pay boxes, etc.

Quick Service Area
In Quick Service Area, consumers are able to receive the services, duration of which do not exceed 2 minutes. For instance, issuance of already printed ID card and Passports, Birth and Marriage Certificates, Documents certified by appostile or legalization, Extracts on property and business registration, etc.

Long Service Area
In Long Service Area, consumers are able to receive the services, delivery of which requires more than 5 minutes, such as submission of an applications for Passport, ID cards, registration of property and business, receipt of biographical certificates from the Archive, etc. Such division of service area minimizes the risk for creation of mass, crowd and chaotic queues in the service area and makes citizens’ more organized and queue of customers who wish to receive services is regulated through integrated Queue Management Electronic System.

Economic Model 
Service provision and its costs are calculated based on the requested delivery period of the service. In case a person requests the service to be provided in shorter time frame than regular period, the additional costs apply to the service.

Most demanded services

 ID card
 Marriage registration
 Passport
 Birth registration
 Property registration

Branches

Public Service Halls have been opened in several cities of Georgia:

Awards
 Winner of New Georgian Brand of 2011
 UN Public Service Award 2012 winner in the nomination of Improvement of Public Service Delivery

Sources

Government of Georgia (country)
Government buildings in Georgia (country)
Government agencies established in 2011
2011 establishments in Georgia (country)